Ysgol y Berwyn is a high-school situated in the town of Bala, in Gwynedd, north Wales.

According to the 2013 Estyn report, 79% of pupils are from Welsh-speaking homes.

In 2017, 80% of pupils achieved 5 or more GCSEs at grades A*-C.

In September 2019, a new 3-19-year-old school opened on site under the name 'Ysgol Godre'r Berwyn' ("Berwyn Lower School").

History

Rev Edmund Meyricke founded a free grammar school at Bala, then in Merionethshire, in 1712. It was originally intended for poor boys. Some sources put the foundation date as 1713–4. Meyricke was Chancellor of St Davids Cathedral and diocese and therefore able to endow the new school with £15, and 5 acres (2 hectares) of land near the town, worth a rentcharge of £15 pa. Rev Thomas Charles (1755–1814), whose statue stands outside the school, was an advocate of foreign missionary work, proselytising the gospel with the British and Foreign Bible Society which he had founded. He lived at Bala, but on his death the property was bequeathed to the grammar school in his will.

Boys were admitted aged seven for about four years. The three R's were taught and reading down the church catechism of prayers.  Boys usually went on to become apprentices and were presented with clothes at Christmastide. The Fellows of Jesus College, Oxford held the right to appoint the Master. They also donated money for the construction of a new house for accommodation.

In 1820, the Master, Rev Humphrey Lloyd, was also vicar of the parish. The present building was constructed in 1851 and modelled very much on Jesus College, its financial and academic patron. The school's former name was Ysgol Tytandomen ("house under the hillock").

The Hall was replaced in 1964, when wooden panelling was erected to commemorate the dead of the Great War. It was built in the mock Tudor Gothic style of slate quoins dressed with sandstone. The original building had two chimney stacks to service the open fire grates. The elevation was divided into three main parts: left, central and right. The school hall to the left flanked the central entrance hall, and a range of storeys to the right.  A gabled bellcote arch opening over the entrance with a Latin inscription dated 1851.  Mullioned windows in a decorative lozenge pattern included above light mullioned windows to bring in more light through the windows for the pupils to read right up to the eaves. There was ventilation in the roof. The hall range was flush and had two storeys and three bays. Gable ends lent themselves to additions.

In 1868 the school's endowment was £80. There were six scholarships available to Jesus College, Oxford. Other charities provided £30 pa. The left wing had 12 sash windows on the ground floor. On the north-east side there were coped walls. In 2001 the Victorian school building received Listing Status Grade 2 because it was a fine example of Tudor Gothic architecture of the mid-19th century, Neuadd-y-Cyfnod, as it is now known in Welsh, has a valuable forecourt, piers and railings preserved. The railings are vital to the impression because so many school railings have been removed. The school is now called Ysgol Y Berwyn; the modern school has a strong connection with Bangor University.

Notable alumni

Thomas Charles (1755-1814), poet and educationalist, founded The Sunday Schools in Wales
Sir Rees Davies CBE (1938-2005), historian of Wales 
Rhys Davies (canoeist) 
Sir Ifan ab Owen Edwards (1895-1970), Welsh academic, writer and film-maker
Sir Owen Morgan Edwards (1858-1920), Welsh historian, writer and educationist
Thomas Edward Ellis (1859-1899), Welsh statesman and Liberal MP, educationalist who supported Home Rule and free schooling, as well as leasehold enfranchisement for Wales.  Supported intermediate school system and County Councils for Wales. Junior whip (1892-4), Shadow Chief Whip (1895-99).
Edward Ernest Hughes (1877-1953), Welsh historian 
Robert Thomas Jenkins (1881-1969), historian and academic
David Evans Jones (1870-1947), a missionary  
John Edward Jones (Welsh politician) (1905-1970)
John Hugh Jones (1843-1910), Welsh Roman Catholic priest, translator and tutor
Ifor Owen (1915-2007), Welsh language writer and illustrator.

Teachers
John Gwyn Griffiths (1911-2004), Welsh poet, Egyptologist, Plaid Cymru activist, and conscientious objector, taught Latin at Bala.

Further reading
 ‘Prize Day at Bala Grammar School’, The Cambrian News and Merionethshire Standard (www.newspaper.library.wales)
 P.J. Wallis, A Sketch of the Grammar School at Bala, 1713-1893
 Malcolm Seaborne, Schools in Wales, 1200-1500:  A Social and Architectural History, Gee & Son, Denbigh, 1992.

References

Secondary schools in Gwynedd
Welsh-language schools
Welsh-language schools in Gwynedd